Daniel Leonhard (born 24 December 1972) is a German sport shooter who competed in the 1996 Summer Olympics and in the 2000 Summer Olympics.

References

1972 births
Living people
German male sport shooters
ISSF pistol shooters
Olympic shooters of Germany
Shooters at the 1996 Summer Olympics
Shooters at the 2000 Summer Olympics